Lobi Traoré (1961 – 1 June 2010) was a Malian musician. He was born in the village of Bakaridianna, on the Niger River close to Ségou and died in Bamako. His singing has been described in The Economist as "flat, strangely penetrating tone, somewhere between rap and blues".

His breakthrough album, Bamako, produced by Ali Farka Touré, was released in 1994. It was voted one of the best rock albums of the year by Libération and one of the best world music albums by Le Monde.

Discography
 Bambara Blues (1992)
 Bamako (1994)
 Ségou (1996)
 Duga (1999)
 Mali Blue (2004)
 The Lobi Traoré Group (2005)
 Barra Coura (2005)
 Bwati Kono (2010)
 Rainy Season Blues (2010)
 Bamako Nights: Live at Bar Bozo 1995 (2013)

References

 "Notes from the Niger", (Aug. 25, 2005), The Economist magazine.

External links
 
 mondomix.com
 mali-music.com (in French)

1961 births
2010 deaths
Malian musicians
People from Ségou Region
Glitterhouse Records artists
21st-century Malian people
Bambara-language singers
World Circuit (record label) artists